The Macchi M.52 was an Italian racing seaplane designed and built by Macchi for the 1927 Schneider Trophy race. The M.52 and a later variant, the M.52bis or M.52R, both set world speed records for seaplanes.

Design and development

M.52
Mario Castoldi (1888–1968) designed the M.52, following the formula he used in designing the successful Macchi M.39, which Major Mario de Bernardi (1893–1959) piloted to victory and a world seaplane speed record in the 1926 Schneider Trophy race and to another world seaplane speed record four days later. Like the M.39, the M.52 was a single-engined, low-wing monoplane on twin floats. Slightly smaller than the M.39, it was powered by a much more powerful engine, the  Fiat AS.3. Despite the significant increase in engine power, the M.52 had a maximum takeoff weight  less than that of the M.39.  Macchi built three M.52s.

M.52bis or M.52R
A restyled version, known both as the M.52bis and M.52R, was also built. Its wingspan and maximum takeoff weight were reduced further from that of the M.52, and it had streamlining improvements including floats with a smaller frontal area. Macchi built a single M.52bis.

Operational history

M.52

Italy entered all three M.52s in the 1927 Schneider Trophy race, which was held at Venice, Italy, on 26 September 1927. All three suffered engine trouble, and none of them finished the race; the 1926 winner de Bernardi officially finished 10th after dropping out, and the best result among the M.52s was that achieved by the one piloted by Captain Federico Guazetti, which did not drop out of the race until the final lap.

M.52bis or M.52R
De Bernardi thus became both the first person to exceed 300 miles per hour (483 km/h) and the first person to exceed 500 kilometres per hour (310 mph).

Although Italy had planned to enter all three of the later Macchi M.67 racing seaplanes in the 1929 Schneider Trophy race, one of them crashed during training. As a substitute, the M.52R was entered alongside the two surviving M.67s to represent Italy in the race, hosted by the United Kingdom, which took place on 7 September 1929 at Calshot on the Isle of Man. Flown by Pilot Marshal (Warrant Officer) Tommaso Dal Molin, it was the only one of the three Italian aircraft to finish, gaining second place with a speed of 457.380 km/h (284.20 mph).

Operators

Regia Marina

Specifications (M.52bis / M.52R)

See also

References
Notes

Bibliography

Further reading

External links

Newsreel footage of 1929 Schneider Trophy racing teams, British Supermarine S.6A aircraft (#2 and #8), and Italian Macchi M.67 (#10) and Macchi M.52R (#4) aircraft at 1929 Schneider Trophy race 

M.52
Floatplanes
1920s Italian experimental aircraft
Schneider Trophy
Racing aircraft
Low-wing aircraft
Single-engined tractor aircraft
Aircraft first flown in 1927